This is a list of Nigerian films released in 2001.

Films

See also
List of Nigerian films

References

External links
2001 films at the Internet Movie Database

2001
Lists of 2001 films by country or language
Films